The Merry Widower (Italian: Il vedovo allegro) is a 1950 Italian romance film directed by Mario Mattoli and starring Carlo Dapporto, Isa Barzizza and Amedeo Nazzari. It was shot at the Farnesina Studios in Rome. The film's sets were designed by the art director Piero Filippone.

Plot
Bebè, a variety artist, runs a nightclub in Cannes on the French Riviera. Unknown to both his girlfriend Lucy and the other performers, he has a young daughter living in San Remo with his grandmother. Lucy becomes suspicious due to his repeated absences, unaware that Bebè's daughter is ill and needs an expensive operation.

Cast
 Carlo Dapporto as Bebè
 Isa Barzizza as Lucy
 Amedeo Nazzari as Il professore De Carlo
 Ave Ninchi as Dolores
 Irasema Dilián as Peggy 
 Luigi Pavese as Il commissario dell'Interpol
 Mimma Beccari as La piccola Anna Maria
 Arnoldo Foà as Roy
 Tina De Mola as La maestrina
 Toti Dal Monte as La suocera
 Cesco Baseggio as Il suocero
 Laura Gore as La dottoressa
 Ubaldo Lay as Shaphiro
 Ughetto Bertucci as Il primo portiere del tabarin
 Mario Pisu as Il nuovo portiere del tabarin
 Aldo Silvani as Un medico anziano
 Vinicio Sofia as Un poliziotto

References

Bibliography
 Chiti, Roberto & Poppi, Roberto. Dizionario del cinema italiano: Dal 1945 al 1959. Gremese Editore, 1991.

External links

Il vedovo allegro in CineDataBase

1950 films
1950s Italian-language films
Italian black-and-white films
Films directed by Mario Mattoli
1950s romance films
Italian romance films
Films set in Cannes
Films set in Italy
1950s Italian films